This is a timeline of Polish history, comprising important legal and territorial changes and political events in Poland and its predecessor states.  To read about the background to these events, see History of Poland.  See also the list of Polish monarchs and list of prime ministers of Poland.

 Centuries: 5th6th7th8th9th10th11th12th13th14th15th16th17th18th19th20th21stSee also

5th century

10th century

11th century

12th century

13th century

14th century

15th century

16th century

17th century

18th century

19th century

20th century

The Second Polish Republic (1918–39)

Occupation of Poland (1939–45)

Communist takeover, Polish People's Republic

Democratic Republic of Poland

21st century

See also
Cities in Poland
 Timeline of Białystok
 Timeline of Gdańsk
 Timeline of Kraków
 Timeline of Łódź 
 Timeline of Lwów (formerly in Poland; now in Ukraine)
 Timeline of Poznań
 Timeline of Szczecin
 Timeline of Warsaw
 Timeline of Wrocław
 Category:Timelines of cities in Poland (in Polish)

References 

Library of Congress, A Country Study: Poland, Chronology of Important Events: online

Further reading

External links
 

 
Years in Poland
Poland